Nerita sanguinolenta is a species of sea snail, a marine gastropod mollusk in the family Neritidae.

Description

Distribution

References

 Nordsieck, F. (1973). A new Neritina in the Mediterranean. La Conchiglia. 53–54: 4
 Streftaris, N.; Zenetos, A.; Papathanassiou, E. (2005). Globalisation in marine ecosystems: the story of non-indigenous marine species across European seas. Oceanogry and Marine Biology: an Annual Review. 43: 419–453

External links
 Menke, C. T. (1829). Verzeichniss der Ansehnlichen Conchylien-Sammlung des Freiherrn von den Malsburg. Pyrmont: Heinrich Gelpte. vi + 123 pp
 Récluz, C. A. (1841). Description de quelques nouvelles espèces de Nérites vivantes. Revue Zoologique, par la Société Cuvierienne. 1841(4): 102–109; 1841(5): 147–152; 1841(9): 273–278; 1841(10): 310–318; 1841(11): 337–343
 Récluz, C. A. (1850). Notice sur le genre Nerita et sur le s.-g. Neritina, avec le catalogue synonymique des Néritines. Journal de Conchyliologie. 1: 131–164, 277–288, pls 7, 11
 Reeve, L. A. (1855). Monograph of the genus Nerita. In: Conchologia Iconica, or, illustrations of the shells of molluscous animals, vol. 9, pls 1–19, and unpaginated text. L. Reeve & Co., London.
 Katsanevakis, S.; Bogucarskis, K.; Gatto, F.; Vandekerkhove, J.; Deriu, I.; Cardoso A.S. (2012). Building the European Alien Species Information Network (EASIN): a novel approach for the exploration of distributed alien species data. BioInvasions Records. 1: 235–245.
  Gofas, S.; Le Renard, J.; Bouchet, P. (2001). Mollusca. in: Costello, M.J. et al. (eds), European Register of Marine Species: a check-list of the marine species in Europe and a bibliography of guides to their identification. Patrimoines Naturels. 50: 180–213
 Zenetos, A.; Çinar, M.E.; Pancucci-Papadopoulou, M.A.; Harmelin, J.-G.; Furnari, G.; Andaloro, F.; Bellou, N.; Streftaris, N.; Zibrowius, H. (2005). Annotated list of marine alien species in the Mediterranean with records of the worst invasive species. Mediterranean Marine Science. 6 (2): 63–118
 Zenetos, A.; Gofas, S.; Verlaque, M.; Cinar, M.; Garcia Raso, J.; Bianchi, C.; Morri, C.; Azzurro, E.; Bilecenoglu, M.; Froglia, C.; Siokou, I.; Violanti, D.; Sfriso, A.; San Martin, G.; Giangrande, A.; Katagan, T.; Ballesteros, E.; Ramos-Espla, A.; Mastrototaro, F.; Ocana, O.; Zingone, A.; Gambi, M.; Streftaris, N. (2010). Alien species in the Mediterranean Sea by 2010. A contribution to the application of European Union's Marine Strategy Framework Directive (MSFD). Part I. Spatial distribution. Mediterranean Marine Science. 11(2): 381–493
 Zenetos, A.; Meriç, E.; Verlaque, M.; Galli, P.; Boudouresque, C.-F.; Giangrande, A.; Cinar, M.; Bilecenoglu, M. (2008). Additions to the annotated list of marine alien biota in the Mediterranean with special emphasis on Foraminifera and Parasites. Mediterranean Marine Science. 9(1): 119–165

Neritidae
Gastropods described in 1829